Piz Canal (2,846 m) is a mountain of the Swiss Lepontine Alps, situated south-west of Vrin in the canton of Graubünden. It is located on the chain between the Val Sumvitg and the Lumnezia, north of Piz Terri.

On its southern flank lies a large unnamed lake (2,585 m).

References

External links
 Piz Canal on Hikr

Mountains of the Alps
Mountains of Switzerland
Mountains of Graubünden
Lepontine Alps
Lumnezia
Two-thousanders of Switzerland